Notoacmea daedala is a species of sea snail or true limpet, a marine  gastropod mollusc in the family Lottiidae, one of the families of true limpets.

References

 Powell A. W. B., New Zealand Mollusca, William Collins Publishers Ltd, Auckland, New Zealand 1979 

Lottiidae
Gastropods of New Zealand
Gastropods described in 1907